Amberpeta is a village in Eluru district in the state of Andhra Pradesh in India. The nearest railway station is Kacheguda(KCG) located at a distance of 0.81 Km.

Demographics

 Indian census, Amberpeta had a population of 5876 of which 2980 were males while 2896 were females. Average Sex Ratio is 972. Child population is 556 which makes up 9.46% of the total population of the village with a sex ratio of 783. In 2011, the literacy rate of the village was 67.35% when compared to 67.02% of Andhra Pradesh.

References 

Villages in Eluru district